North West Central is an electoral district of the Legislative Assembly in the Australian state of Western Australia.

The district is mostly based in the rural north-west of Western Australia. It is currently a marginal seat for the Nationals.

History
First known as North West Coastal, the district was first created for the 2005 state election, incorporating territory from the abolished districts of Burrup and Ningaloo. The seat was won by Labor MP, and then member for Burrup, Fred Riebeling.

The district was expanded for the 2008 state election, incorporating more inland territory which resulted in the name change to North West. With Riebeling's decision to retire, the contest pitted Labor MP Vince Catania, then a member of the Legislative Council, against Liberal candidate, and former Ningaloo MP, Rod Sweetman, with Catania emerging victorious. On 20 July 2009, Catania announced his decision to leave the Labor Party to join the rival National Party.

The 2013 state election saw the Labor-leaning Shire of Roebourne transferred to the Pilbara while taking more central areas of the state including the shires of Sandstone and Wiluna, increasing National's hold on the seat. The increase in terms of area in the central part of the state saw yet another name change to North West Central.

Catania resigned on 8 August 2022, resulting in the 2022 North West Central state by-election, which was retained for the Nationals by Merome Beard.

Geography
Based in the remote north-west of Western Australia, the district includes the towns of Carnarvon, Coral Bay, Cue, Denham, Exmouth, Meekatharra, Mount Magnet, Onslow, Paraburdoo, Sandstone, Tom Price, Warburton, Wiluna and Yalgoo.

Members

Election results

See also
Division of Durack for the Australian House of Representatives, the largest Federal division by area

References

External links
 
 
 
 

North West Coastal
Gascoyne